John Pass or Paas (c.1783–1832) was an English engraver and murder victim.

Life

Pass was an established copper plate engraver in Pentonville, London. He made plates for The History, Civil and Ecclesiastical, and Survey of the Antiquities of Winchester (1798–1801) by John Milner. John Wilkes the London bookseller, who was from Winchester,  knew him at the end of the 18th century, and took him on for illustrations of his Encyclopaedia Londoniensis. Pass produced plates for volume 13 of the work.

John Paas (name used legally) was murdered in Leicester by James Cook, in a criminal case that attracted wide attention. He was aged 49, a partner in the firm Paas & Co. of High Holborn, London, engravers. He was in Leicester as a travelling salesman of specialist hardware. Cook, a printer and bookbinder, was exhibited on a gibbet after being hanged, the last British criminal to be so treated.

Paas & Co.
The firm of C. and A. Paas & Co. was in business at various Holborn addresses in the second half of the 18th century. One of the partners, Cornelius Paas, an engraver from Germany, came to London around 1765.

Notes

External links
British Library, Untold lives blog, Credit Crunch leads to Murder 18 October 2011

1832 deaths
English engravers
Male murder victims
People murdered in England
Year of birth uncertain